The following is a list of events and new Spanish and Portuguese-language music that happened or are expected to happen in 2023 in the Latin music industry. Latin regions include Ibero-America, Spain, Portugal, and the United States.

Events

January–March 

 January 8 – Daddy Yankee makes his final concert after performing for 32 years. It was held at Hiram Bithorn Stadium in San Juan, Puerto Rico.
 January 12 – After just nine hours, "Shakira: Bzrp Music Sessions, Vol. 53", performed by Bizarrap and Shakira, breaks the record of the most streamed Spanish-language song on YouTube in a single day. It was previously held by "Despacito (remix)", performed by Luis Fonsi and Daddy Yankee featuring Justin Bieber.
 January 16 – "Shakira: Bzrp Music Sessions, Vol. 53" becomes the song with the best debut performance in Spain of the 21st century, debuting atop the chart with just one day of tracking.
 January 22 – For the first time in Spotify history, the Latin artist with the most monthly listeners is a woman, Shakira.
 February 4 – "Eaea", written by Álvaro Tato, Blanca Paloma Ramos and Jose Pablo Polo, and performed by Blanca Paloma, wins the second edition of the Benidorm Fest, and will represent Spain in the Eurovision Song Contest in Liverpool.
 February 5 – The 65th Annual Grammy Awards are scheduled to take place at Crypto.com Arena in Los Angeles.
 Pasieros by Rubén Blades and Boca Livre wins Best Latin Pop Album.
 Motomami by Rosalía wins Best Latin Rock or Alternative Album
 Un Canto por México - El Musical by Natalia Lafourcade wins Best Regional Mexican Music Album.
 Un Verano Sin Ti by Bad Bunny wins Best Música Urbana Album
 Pa'llá Voy by Marc Anthony wins Best Tropical Latin Album.
 Fandango at the Wall in New York by Arturo O'Farrill and The Afro Latin Jazz Orchestra featuring The Congra Patria Son Jarocho Collective wins Best Latin Jazz Album.
 February 11 – "Sintiéndolo Mucho", performed by Joaquín Sabina and Leiva, wins the Goya Award for Best Original Song.
February 19 – The Viña del Mar International Song Festival makes its comeback after being canceled for three years due to the COVID-19 pandemic.
 February 22 – Juan Manuel Moreno, President of the Regional Government of Andalusia announces that the 24th Annual Latin Grammy Awards will take place in Seville, marking the first time the event is celebrated outside the United States.
 February 23 – The 35th Premios lo Nuestro awards ceremony takes place at the Dade Arena in Miami, United States.
 Un Verano Sin Ti by Bad Bunny wins Album of the Year.
 "Mamiii" by Becky G and Karol G wins Song of the Year.
 Karol G wins Artist of the Year.
 Bizarrap wins Best New Male Artist.
 Kim Loaiza wins Best New Female Artist.
February 25 – Mañana Será Bonito by Karol G breaks the record for the most-streamed female Spanish-language album in a single day with 32 milion streams.
 March 1 – Becky G was awarded with the Impact Award at Billboard Women in Music, while Rosalía received the first-ever Producer of the Year award.
 March 5 – Mañana Será Bonito by Karol G became the first ever female Spanish-language album to debut atop the Billboard 200.
 March 11 – The final of the 57th Festival da Canção is scheduled to be held in Lisbon, determining Portugal's entry for the Eurovision Song Contest.

April–June 

 April 14 – Bad Bunny headlines the twenty second edition of Coachella, becoming the first Latino artist to headline the festival. Other performers include Becky G, Rosalía, Eladio Carrión and Los Fabulosos Cadillacs.

Number-one albums and singles by country
List of Billboard Argentina Hot 100 number-one singles of 2023
List of number-one albums of 2023 (Portugal)
List of number-one albums of 2023 (Spain)
List of number-one singles of 2023 (Spain)
List of number-one Billboard Latin Albums from the 2020s
List of Billboard Hot Latin Songs and Latin Airplay number ones of 2023

Awards

Latin music awards
35th Lo Nuestro Awards
2023 Billboard Latin Music Awards
2023 Latin American Music Awards
2023 Latin Grammy Awards
2023 Heat Latin Music Awards
2023 MTV Millennial Awards
2023 Tejano Music Awards

Awards with Latin categories
29th Billboard Music Awards
64th Annual Grammy Awards
9th iHeartRadio Music Awards
17th Los40 Music Awards
39th MTV Video Music Awards
24th Teen Choice Awards
3rd Annual Premios Odeón

Spanish- and Portuguese-language songs on the Billboard Global 200 
The Billboard Global 200 is a weekly record chart published by Billboard magazine that ranks the top songs globally based on digital sales and online streaming from over 200 territories worldwide.

An asterisk (*) represents that a single is charting for the current week.

Spanish-language songs on the Billboard Hot 100
The Billboard Hot 100 ranks the most-played songs in the United States based on sales (physical and digital), radio play, and online streaming. Also included are certifications awarded by the Recording Industry Association of America (RIAA) based on digital downloads and on-demand audio and/or video song streams: gold certification is awarded for sales of 500,000 copies, platinum for one million units, and multi-platinum for two million units, and following in increments of one million thereafter. The RIAA also awards Spanish-language songs under the Latin certification: Disco de Oro (Gold) is awarded for sales 30,000 certification copies, Disco de Platino (Platinum) for 60,000 units, and Disco de Multi-Platino (Multi-Platinum) for 120,000 units, and following in increments of 60,000 thereafter.

Albums released 
The following is a list of notable Latin albums (music performed in Spanish or Portuguese)  that have been released in Latin America, Spain, Portugal, or the United States in 2023.

First quarter

January

February

March

Notes

References

 
Latin music by year